The first season of the American television comedy series The Golden Girls originally aired on NBC in the United States between September 14, 1985, and May 10, 1986. Created by television writer Susan Harris, the series was produced by Witt/Thomas/Harris Productions and ABC Studios (Touchstone Television.) It starred Bea Arthur, Rue McClanahan, Betty White, and Estelle Getty as the main characters Dorothy Zbornak, Blanche Devereaux, Rose Nylund, and Sophia Petrillo. The series revolves around the lives of four older women living together in a house in Miami.

The first season of The Golden Girls premiered to strong ratings for NBC, ranking number one in its first week on air and number seven among all primetime programs airing during the 1985–86 primetime network season. Upon its initial airing, the show was met with critical acclaim and was the recipient of various industry awards, including three Emmy Awards and two Golden Globe awards. Buena Vista Home Entertainment (now Walt Disney Studios Home Entertainment)  released the first season on DVD in the United States on November 24, 2004, and in Canada on April 10, 2007.

Episodes

Development

Conception

NBC senior vice president Warren Littlefield conceived the idea of the series during the taping of a television special aimed at promoting the new 1984–85 season lineup. The special featured a skit by Night Courts Selma Diamond and Remington Steeles Doris Roberts promoting the upcoming show Miami Vice as Miami Nice, a parody about old people living in Miami, Florida. Amused by the performance, he visualized a series based on the geriatric humor of the female performers.

Littlefield met with producers Paul Junger Witt and Tony Thomas, who were pitching a series about a female lawyer, to ask about developing Miami Nice. Witt asked his wife, Susan Harris, to write the series after the duo's original writer had declined. Harris, who was planning on retiring after  Thomas and her ABC series Soap, was interested, noting that "it was a demographic that had never been addressed." Though her vision of a sitcom about women in their 60s differed with NBC's request to write a comedy about women at the age of around 40, Littlefield was impressed when he received Harris' pilot script and subsequently approved production of the pilot. The Cosby Show director Jay Sandrich, who had previously worked with Harris, Witt, and Thomas on Soap, agreed to direct.

The pilot also includes the girls' gay houseboy, Coco (Charles Levin), who lived with them.  Levin had been suggested by then-NBC president Brandon Tartikoff based on his groundbreaking recurring gay role, Eddie Gregg, on NBC's Emmy-winning drama, Hill Street Blues.  After the pilot, the character of Coco was eliminated from the series.

Crew
The season aired on NBC in the United States on Saturday nights at 9:00 pm EST. Harris, her husband Paul Junger Witt, and Tony Thomas were the executive producers for the season. The season featured a panel of writers. Harris and Winifred Hervey each wrote five episodes for the season. Writing duos James Berg and Stan Zimmerman and Kathy Speer and Terry Grossman each wrote three episodes for the season, while Barry Fanaro and Mort Nathan wrote five episodes, including the season finale. Liz Sage wrote two episodes, and Susan Beavers, Bob Colleary, Christopher Lloyd, and Stuart Silverman were each credited for an episode.

Directors for the season included Paul Bogart, Jim Drake, Terry Hughes, Jay Sandrich, Jack Shea, and Gary Shimokawa. Bogart directed four episodes for the season. Hughes was credited for 10 episodes, and Drake received directing credits for eight episodes. Sandrich, Shea, and Shimokawa each directed one episode for the season.

Casting

Based on their previous work on Maude and The Mary Tyler Moore Show, Rue McClanahan and Betty White were considered for the parts of Rose Nylund, the bubbly Nordic woman, and Blanche Devereaux, the sexy siren, respectively. Sandrich, who was hired to film the pilot, suggested that the women switch roles to avoid typecasting. 

The character of Dorothy Zbornak was tailored toward Bea Arthur, but being unavailable at the time, the producers looked at Elaine Stritch for the role. When her audition flopped, Harris asked McClanahan to convince Arthur, with whom she costarred on Maude, to take the role. Arthur flipped upon reading the script, but was apprehensive because of McClanahan's approach, as she did not "want to play (their Maude characters) Maude and Vivian meet Sue Ann Nivens." Arthur was further convinced when hearing that White would be playing Rose and McClanahan would be playing Blanche. 

The role of Sophia Petrillo, Dorothy's mother, was played by Estelle Getty, who was discovered by Tony Thomas while performing in the Broadway play Torch Song Trilogy as the mother character. Getty, being younger than Arthur and White, wore heavy make-up, thick glasses, and a white wig to age her. The character of Sophia was thought by the creators to enhance the idea that three retirement-age women could be young. Disney's Michael Eisner explains, "Estelle Getty made our three women into girls. And that was, to me, what made it seem like it could be a contemporary, young show."

Reception and accolades

Ratings
The Golden Girls debuted on September 14, 1985, in its 9:00 pm Saturday-night timeslot, following a broadcast of the Miss America contest and preceding another new comedy series, 227. The debut episode garnered a 25.0 household rating and a 43 share, which translates to a reach of 21.5 million homes. It was the highest-rated program of the week, and the highest-rated premiere of a program in two years. The show also elevated the ratings for Saturday nights, which were on a steep decline in the years preceding its debut. After five episodes, the series was averaging a 21.5 household rating, landing among the top-20 highest-rated programs.

Critical reception
When the first episode aired, New York Times writer Aljean Harmetz claimed that surprisingly, "nearly everybody is sure the show will be a hit."  On Metacritic, a site which uses a weighted mean score, the season scored a 82/100 from six critics, translating to "universal acclaim".

Accolades

At the 38th Primetime Emmy Awards, The Golden Girls won the award for Outstanding Comedy Series. Bea Arthur, Rue McClanahan, and Betty White received nominations for Outstanding Lead Actress in a Comedy Series, with White winning for her performance in the episode "In a Bed of Rose's". Estelle Getty received a nomination for Outstanding Supporting Actress in a Comedy Series. Barry Fanaro and Mort Nathan won the Emmy award for Outstanding Writing for a Comedy Series for the episode "A Little Romance". Susan Harris also received nomination for the award for the pilot episode. Directors Jim Drake and Terry Hughes each received a nomination for Outstanding Directing for a Comedy Series for their work in "The Heart Attack" and "A Little Romance", respectively. At the 43rd Golden Globe Awards, the series won the award for Best Television Series – Musical or Comedy. The four lead actress were each nominated for the award for Best Actress – Television Series Musical or Comedy, with Getty tying with Cybill Shepherd for the award. Jay Sandrich won the Directors Guild of America Award for Outstanding Directing – Comedy Series for the episode "The Engagement" at the 38th Directors Guild of America Awards. The series was also nominated at the 2nd TCA Awards for Outstanding Achievement in Comedy.

DVD release
The first season was released on November 23, 2004, in North America. The set contains three discs, comprising 25 total episodes, and a fashion commentary bonus feature, in which Joan and Melissa Rivers provide a critique on the costumes worn by the main characters. The entire first season was also released in the series collection entitled The Golden Girls: 25th Anniversary Complete Collection, released on November 9, 2010.

References

The Golden Girls seasons
1985 American television seasons
1986 American television seasons